The 2022–23 Esteghlal Football Club season is the 77th season and the club's 29th consecutive season in the top flight of Iranian football. In addition to the domestic league, Esteghlal are participating in this season's editions of the Hazfi Cup, and the Iranian Super Cup.

Esteghlal did not play any matches between 2 November and 16 December due to a mid-season break in accommodation of the 2022 FIFA World Cup in Qatar. Persian Gulf Pro League was suspended after matchday 11.

Players
Last updated:

Transfers

In

Out

Pre-season and friendlies

Competitions

Overview

Persian Gulf Pro League

Standings

Results summary

Results by round

Matches
The league fixtures were announced on 25 July 2022.

Hazfi Cup

Esteghlal entered the tournament in the round of 32.

Iranian Super Cup

Statistics

Squad statistics

|-
! colspan="18" style="background:#dcdcdc; text-align:center"| Players transferred/loaned out during the season

Goals
The list is sorted by shirt number when total goals are equal.

Clean sheets

Notes

References

Esteghlal F.C. seasons
Esteghlal